Elections to Stevenage Council were held on 7 May 1998.  One third of the council was up for election; the seats which were last contested in 1994. The Labour Party stayed in overall control of the council.

After the election, the composition of the council was:
Labour 37
Liberal Democrat 2

Election result

All comparisons in seats and vote share are to the corresponding 1994 election.

Ward results

Bandley Hill

Bedwell Plash

Chells

Longmeadow

Martins Wood

Mobbsbury

Monkswood

Old Stevenage

Pin Green

Roebuck

St Nicholas

Shephall

Symonds Green

References

1998
1998 English local elections
1990s in Hertfordshire